The 1989 Rous Cup was the fifth and final staging of the Rous Cup international football competition, based around the England–Scotland football rivalry.

As in the previous two years, a South American team was also invited to compete in a triangular tournament, with Chile being this year's entrant. World champions Argentina had been originally invited but declined, citing domestic fixture congestion. Their invitation had been disapproved of by the British government, given the cut relations between the two nations following the 1982 Falklands War.

England won the competition for the second year running, and third time in its five years of existence. This marked the final time any England vs Scotland matches would be arranged by the countries until friendly played in August 2013. The three meetings between the teams that took place during this 24-year-long interval were during UEFA competitions (in the Euro 1996 group stage and the two legs of the Euro 2000 qualification play-offs).

Due to the English First Division being extended to enable Liverpool to complete their fixtures that had been postponed following the Hillsborough disaster on 15 April 1989, England were unable to select any players from Liverpool or Arsenal (Liverpool's final opponent) for the tournament.

Results
All times listed are British Summer Time (UTC+1)

England vs Chile

Scotland vs England

Scotland vs Chile

Final standings

Goalscorers

1 goal
 Steve Bull
 Chris Waddle
 Murdo MacLeod
 Alan McInally

References

Rous Cup
Rous
Rous
Rous
International association football competitions hosted by England
International association football competitions hosted by Scotland
May 1989 sports events in the United Kingdom